The 2012–13 Super League Greece was the 77th season of the highest football league of Greece and the seventh under the name Super League. The season started on 25 August 2012 and ended on 2 June 2013 with the last matches of the play-off round. Olympiacos were the defending champions, having won their 39th Greek championship in the 2011–12 season. They successfully defended their crown, finishing 15 points ahead of second-placed PAOK.

The league comprised 13 teams from the 2011–12 season and three promoted teams from the 2011–12 Football League.

Teams
Three teams were relegated at the end of the 2011–12 season to the 2012–13 Football League: Doxa Drama, Panetolikos, Ergotelis.

Three teams were promoted from the 2011–12 Football League, champions Panthrakikos, runners-up Veria and the winners of a four-team play-off round Platanias. Panthrakikos and Veria returned to top level respectively two and four years after relegation, while Platanias made their debut.

Stadiums and locations

Personnel and kits
Note: Flags indicate national team as has been defined under FIFA eligibility rules. Players and Managers may hold more than one non-FIFA nationality.

Adidas is the official ball supplier for Super League Greece.

Managerial changes

Regular season

League table

Results

Positions by round
The table lists the positions of teams after each week of matches. In order to preserve chronological evolvements, any postponed matches are not included in the round at which they were originally scheduled, but added to the full round they were played immediately afterwards.

Play-offs
In the play-off for Champions League, the four qualified teams play each other in a home and away round robin. However, they do not all start with 0 points. Instead, a weighting system applies to the teams' standing at the start of the play-off mini-league. The team finishing fifth in the Super League will start the play-off with 0 points. The fifth placed team's end of season tally of points is subtracted from the sum of the points that other teams have. This number is then divided by five.

Season statistics
Updated to games played on 21 April 2013.

Top scorers

Top assists

Awards

Annual awards
Annual awards were announced on 3 February 2014

Player of the Year 

The Player of the Year awarded to  Djamel Abdoun (Olympiacos)

Foreign Player of the Year 

The Foreign Player of the Year awarded to  Ruben Rayos (Asteras Tripolis)

Top goalscorer of the Year 

The Top goalscorer of the Year awarded to  Rafik Djebbour (Olympiacos)

Greek Player of the Year 
The Greek Player of the Year awarded to  Dimitris Papadopoulos (Panthrakikos)

Manager of the Year 

The Manager of the Year awarded to  Giannis Christopoulos (PAS Giannina)

Young Player of the Year 

The Young Player of the Year awarded to  Ergys Kaçe (PAOK)

Goalkeeper of the Year 

The Goalkeeper of the Year awarded to  Orestis Karnezis (Panathinaikos)

References

External links
 

Super League Greece seasons
1
Greece